The 2016 Challenger Banque Nationale de Saguenay was a professional tennis tournament played on indoor hard courts. It was the 11th edition of the tournament and part of the 2016 ITF Women's Circuit, offering a total of $50,000 in prize money. It took place in Saguenay, Quebec, Canada between October 17 and October 23, 2016.

Singles main-draw entrants

Seeds

1 Rankings are as of October 10, 2016

Other entrants
The following players received wildcards into the singles main draw:
 Lauren Chypyha
 Gabriela Dabrowski
 Catherine Leduc
 Vanessa Wong

The following players received entry from the qualifying draw:
 Elena Bovina
 Danielle Collins
 Charlotte Robillard-Millette
 Katherine Sebov

The following player received entry by junior exempt:
 Bianca Andreescu

Champions

Singles

 Catherine Bellis def.  Bianca Andreescu, 6–4, 6–2

Doubles

 Elena Bogdan /  Mihaela Buzărnescu def.  Bianca Andreescu /  Charlotte Robillard-Millette, 6–4, 6–7(4–7), [10–6]

External links
Official website

Challenger Banque Nationale de Saguenay
Challenger de Saguenay
Challenger Banque Nationale de Saguenay